Meshwo or Meshwa is a river flowing in north and central parts Gujarat, state of India. Meshwo is the tributary river of the Sabarmati and subtribunary of the Vatrak River. It rises in the Panchara hills of Aravalli range, in the Dungarpur district of Rajasthan and enters in Gujarat at Shamlaji.

Basin 
Meshwo rises in Aravalli range and flows through Modasa, Bhiloda, Prantij of Sabarkantha and Aravalli district; Ahmedabad district and Kheda district. Meshwo meets Vatrak after near to Kheda. Meshwo flows parallel to Khari River for 203 kilometres. 8 villages of Bhiloda Taluka, 17 villages of Modasa Tauka and 12 villages of Ahmedabad and Kheda district are inhabited on Meshwo.

Dams 
Bombay Presidency had planned to construct dam on the river in 1926 but dropped idea after facing oppose from the Idar State. In 1945 it had been planned again and land was surveyed in 1947 for it.  Permission to construct the dam was given in 1950 and the work was completed in the same year.

Another dam on the Meshwo was constructed near the Shamlaji in year 1968-69 while the construction work begun in 1957-58. Lake built after the dam has capacity to provide water for irrigation in 17.21 thousand hector land. Meshwo has peakup weir dam constructed near Raska village of Mahemdavad Taluka and the scheme was started to provide drinking water to Ahmedabad in 2000.

Notable places on bank of Meshwo 
 Shamlaji, Hindu pilgrimage site
 Devni Mori, historical site

References 

Rivers of Gujarat
Rivers of India